The 2006 Malta Cup was a professional ranking snooker tournament that took place between 30 January and 5 February 2006 at the Hilton Conference Center in Portomaso, Malta.

Ken Doherty won in the final 9–8 against John Higgins. Higgins had recovered from 2–5 down to lead 8–5 but Doherty won the last four frames to win the title.

This years tournament was also noteworthy for Ronnie O'Sullivan's decision not to compete, which cost him the World Number 1 ranking for the start of the following season and allowed Stephen Hendry to regain the number one position for the first time since 1999.



Wild-card round

Main draw

Final

Qualifying

Qualifying for the tournament took place at Pontins in Prestatyn, Wales between 7 and 10 November 2005.

Century breaks

Qualifying stage centuries

 137  Jamie Cope
 135  Gary Wilkinson
 129  Dave Harold
 124  Jamie Burnett
 120, 101  Robin Hull
 116  Nick Dyson
 107  Mark Allen
 106  Mark Davis

 105, 100  David Gilbert
 105  Joe Swail
 104  Rod Lawler
 103  Ali Carter
 102  Stuart Mann
 101  Judd Trump
 100  Liang Wenbo
 100  James Wattana

Televised stage centuries

 142, 131, 104, 103  Stephen Hendry
 135  Barry Hawkins
 133, 127, 103  Stephen Maguire
 133, 126, 104  Robin Hull
 133, 119, 106, 105  Ken Doherty
 132, 105  Graeme Dott
 129  Stuart Bingham
 114, 105, 102  John Higgins
 114  Tony Drago

 111  Mark King
 104  Mark Allen
 104  Steve Davis
 104  Joe Swail
 103  Stephen Lee
 100  Alan McManus
 100  Gerard Greene
 100  Marco Fu

References

2006
Malta Cup
Cup
Snooker in Malta